Mike Crumb (born November 24, 1970) is a former Canadian football safety who played eight seasons in the Canadian Football League with the BC Lions and Toronto Argonauts. He played CIS football at University of Saskatchewan. Crumb is the older brother of former CFL player Jason Crumb. He was a member of the Toronto Argonauts team that won the 92nd Grey Cup.

References

External links
Just Sports Stats
Okanagan Sun profile

Fanbase profile

1970 births
BC Lions players
Canadian football defensive backs
Living people
Players of Canadian football from British Columbia
Saskatchewan Huskies football players
Sportspeople from Kelowna
Toronto Argonauts players